Caroline Rose Giuliani (born 1989) is an American filmmaker, political activist, and writer. She is the daughter of Rudy Giuliani, the former Mayor of New York City. Giuliani has received national media attention for publicly disagreeing with and criticizing her Republican father's politics and political endorsements.

Early life and family 
Giuliani was born in 1989 to Donna Hanover, a journalist and television personality, and Rudy Giuliani, an attorney and Republican politician. She is of Italian descent on her father's side. Her paternal great-grandparents, Rodolfo and Evangelina Giuliani, were from Tuscany. Her great-uncle, Tullio "Leo" D'Avanzo, operated a loan sharking and gambling ring at a restaurant in Brooklyn. Her brother, Andrew Giuliani, served as Special Assistant to the President and Associate Director of the Office of Public Liaison for former U.S. President Donald Trump.

Prior to her birth, Giuliani's father had served as the United States Attorney for the Southern District of New York and as the United States Associate Attorney General. In 1993 her father was elected Mayor of New York City, and the family moved into Gracie Mansion in 1994, the official mayoral residence in Carl Schurz Park. In October 2000 her parents filed for divorce and her father moved out of Gracie Mansion in August of the following year. Giuliani continued to live at Gracie Mansion with her mother and brother until her father's term ended in December 2001. The family relocated to a home in East Manhattan. Her parents' divorce was finalized in 2002. In 2003 her father married Judith Nathan, a nurse and medical sales executive, and her mother married Edwin Oster, an attorney. In 2018 her father joined President Donald Trump's legal team. Giuliani has been estranged from her father since her parents' divorce.

Giuliani was raised in the Catholic faith and was baptized by Monsignor Alan Placa. She was educated at Trinity School, a private school in Manhattan that is part of the Ivy Preparatory School League, graduating in 2007. She attended Harvard College, where she studied theatre and film production. At Harvard, Giuliani served as the experimental theater coordinator of the Harvard Radcliffe Dramatic Club and interned with documentary filmmaker Ross McElwee. Giuliani also trained with the Atlantic Theater Company in New York, the Royal Academy of Dramatic Art in London, and Collaborative Arts Project 21, a partnership with New York University's Tisch School of the Arts.

Career 
Giuliani is a filmmaker, writer, and director creating work focusing on mental health and human sexuality. Giuliani began her work in the film industry as a production assistant in Hollywood, working on the American Broadcasting Company's 2012-2013 supernatural drama 666 Park Avenue and 2013-2014 sitcom Trophy Wife, and HBO's 2013-2014 sitcom Hello Ladies. After working as a production assistant, she became the assistant of Steve Beeks, the Co-President and Co-Chief Operating Officer of Lionsgate. She later worked for Gotham Group as an assistant to producer Jeremy Bell. She was promoted by Ellen Goldsmith-Vein and began running her own office as a junior manager and television coordinator. After leaving Gotham, she worked as the director's assistant on Netflix's 2019 romantic comedy Someone Great.

In 2020 she created the psychological thriller film Or (Someone) Else about a woman struggling in an abusive relationship and the mental health ramifications of repressed anger.

Personal life 
Giuliani is pansexual and polyamorous. She previously identified as bisexual.

On August 4, 2010, she was arrested by New York City police and charged with petty larceny for shoplifting from the Sephora store on East 86th Street. She was detained and later released. Represented by attorney Michael F. Bachner, Giuliani took a plea deal to perform one day of community service and had her criminal record cleared after a probation period of six months.

Political views 
Despite coming from a prominent Republican family, Giuliani has supported Democratic candidates. During the 2008 United States presidential election, while her father was seeking the Republican nomination, she joined a Facebook group supporting Barack Obama called One Million Strong for Barack, and posted on her profile that she was a "liberal." Giuliani left the Facebook group after online activity was reported in the media. She supported Hillary Clinton in the 2016 United States presidential election, while her father was a vocal supporter of Donald Trump. In 2016, when questioned about her political beliefs contradicting with her father's, she stated, "he knows and is fully comfortable with it and thinks I have a right to my opinion."

On September 30, 2020, Giuliani tweeted a response to a tweet made by her father accusing Hunter Biden of being a liar. She stated, "I, for one, do not support spreading false gossip about a politician’s child."

On October 15, 2020, Giuliani wrote a piece for Vanity Fair titled "Rudy Giuliani Is My Father. Please, Everyone, Vote for Joe Biden and Kamala Harris", calling for American voters to end Donald Trump's "reign of terror" and encouraging them to "elect a compassionate and decent president." In response to her father being a Trump supporter, Giuliani stated, "I may not be able to change my father's mind, but together, we can vote this toxic administration out of office." She went on to say, "if being the daughter of a polarizing mayor who became the president's personal bulldog has taught me anything, it is that corruption starts with 'yes-men' and women, the cronies who create an echo chamber of lies and subservience to maintain their proximity to power." She accused the Trump administration of stoking "the injustice that already permeated" society, and criticized Trump's handling of the COVID-19 pandemic and his policies that rolled back protections for the LGBTQ community, women, immigrants, people with disabilities, and people of color. She went on to endorse former U.S. Vice President Joe Biden and Senator Kamala Harris for the 2020 United States presidential election, and praised Biden's plans to combat climate change. Giuliani later tweeted a photo of her and Harris.

On November 24, 2020, Giuliani wrote a second piece for Vanity Fair, titled "Attention, Trumpworld: Self-Care Tips for Accepting the Reality That Trump Lost".

References

External links 
 

Living people
1989 births
American people of Italian descent
American writers of Italian descent
American political activists
American women screenwriters
Pansexual women
Catholics from New York (state)
Filmmakers from New York (state)
Giuliani family
Harvard College alumni
LGBT Roman Catholics
American LGBT writers
New York (state) Democrats
People from New York City
Shoplifters
Date of birth missing (living people)
Polyamorous people